BVG may refer to:

Acronyms and initialisms 
 , the main public transport company of Berlin
  ( or ), Federal Court of Justice of Germany
 Bayview Glen School (BVG), a private school in Toronto
 , a public transport company of Bremen, Germany
 Buena Vista Games, former name of a video game publisher named after Disney Interactive Studios
 , the centerpiece of the Constitution of Austria
 BVG, a group to which English singer Sian Charlesworth briefly belonged

Codes
 Berlevåg Airport, Norway (IATA code: BVG)
 Bonkeng language of Cameroon (ISO code: bvg)
 , a former railway station in Stockholm (station code: Bvg)